Emergency Mayhem is a racing action video game developed by Supersonic Software and published by Codemasters for the Wii.

Gameplay
The game is based around the three main emergency services (fire, police and emergency medical services). The player must drive to the destination as quickly as possible. There's a minigame at the end of each level, which is based around defusing the situation. These minigames use the Wii Remote's motion sensing. These minigames include administering CPR, disarming bombs, wrangling escaped zoo animals, among others.

Development
Emergency Mayhem was announced for the PlayStation 2 and Xbox at the 2004 Electronic Entertainment Expo, published by Acclaim Entertainment and developed by Acclaim Studios Cheltenham. However, the game was canceled when Acclaim Entertainment closed down Acclaim Studios Cheltenham and eventually filed for bankruptcy in September of the same year.

In May 2007, it was announced that Codemasters had acquired the rights to the title and would release it for the Wii, with Warner Bros. Interactive Entertainment handling North American distribution rights. In December, the game was officially announced by Codemasters for a release within the second quarter of 2008 and was also confirmed that Supersonic Software would develop the game.

Reception
The game has generally been received negative. GameSpot gave the game a 2.5/10 and criticized the game for its lack of variety, "wildly uneven difficulty" said that some minigames have "overly sensitive controls" while "others are completely unresponsive". IGN gave the game a 5.0/10 and thought that the graphics were "generic and dated" and the gameplay was "fun, but shallow and repetitive. And there's nothing besides the gimmicky minis that hasn't already been done by Crazy Taxi". They praised it for having "fitting music" and "60 frames at all time".

Awards
GameSpot nominated Emergency Mayhem for the dubious award of Flat-Out Worst Game in its 2008 video game awards.

See also
Emergency Heroes, another Wii game released in the same year involving emergency vehicles

References

2008 video games
Action video games
Cancelled PlayStation 2 games
Cancelled Xbox games
Codemasters games
Medical video games
Racing video games
Video games about bomb disposal
Video games about firefighting
Video games about police officers
Wii games
Wii-only games
Multiplayer and single-player video games
Video games developed in the United Kingdom
Supersonic Software games